José Miguel Pérez (born 31 August 1986, in Cuenca, Spain) is a Spanish triathlete.

At the 2012 Summer Olympics men's triathlon on Tuesday 7 August he placed 24th.

References

External links
sports-reference.com

1986 births
Living people
Spanish male triathletes
Triathletes at the 2012 Summer Olympics
Olympic triathletes of Spain
People from Cuenca, Spain
Sportspeople from the Province of Cuenca
20th-century Spanish people
21st-century Spanish people